Great Cob island is a small island in the estuary of the River Blackwater in Essex, England, the United Kingdom. The island is an area of low-lying salt marsh in the tidal channel known as Virley Channel that runs to the east of the village of Tollesbury. It lies just to the south of the RSPB nature reserve of Old Hall Marshes.

See also
Cobmarsh Island
Northey Island
Osea Island
Sunken Island

References

Islands of Essex
Maldon District